Henry Hutton (26 August 1878 – 13 August 1968) was an Australian cricketer. He played in one first-class match for South Australia in 1905/06.

See also
 List of South Australian representative cricketers

References

External links
 

1878 births
1968 deaths
Australian cricketers
South Australia cricketers
Cricketers from Masterton